Stephen Roberts (23 November 1895 – 17 July 1936) was an American film director. He directed more than 100 films between 1923 and 1936. He was born in Summersville, West Virginia, and died in Los Angeles, California from a heart attack.

Selected filmography
 Cheer Up (1924) directed by Stephen Roberts with Cliff Bowes, Virginia Vance, Eddie Boland
 The Radio Bug (1926) short comedy filmed in both silent and Phonofilm versions
 Listen Lena (1927)
 Lady and Gent (1932)
 If I Had a Million (1932)
 The Story of Temple Drake (1933)
 The Trumpet Blows (1934)
 Romance in Manhattan (1935)
 Star of Midnight 1935, RKO. Source:  Graham Greene on Film, Simon and Schuster 1972, p. 14.
 The Ex-Mrs. Bradford (1936)

References

External links

1895 births
1936 deaths
Film directors from West Virginia
People from Summersville, West Virginia